The Episcopal Diocese of Central Florida is a diocese in Florida in Province IV of the Episcopal Church. It is bounded on the north by the Episcopal Diocese of Florida, on the east by the Atlantic Ocean, on the south by the dioceses of Southeast Florida and Southwest Florida and on the west by the Gulf of Mexico. 
The two largest cities in the diocese are Orlando, with over 220,000 people, and Port St. Lucie, with over 150,000 people. The Kennedy Space Center and Walt Disney World are within the boundaries of the diocese. Orlando, where St. Luke's Cathedral is located, is the see city of the diocese.

The diocese includes 15 counties, as follows: Brevard, Citrus, Hardee, Highlands, Indian River, Lake, Okeechobee, Orange, Osceola, Marion,
Polk, Seminole, St. Lucie, Sumter and Volusia.

History
In 1969 the Diocese of Central Florida, the Diocese of Southeast Florida, and the Diocese of Southwest Florida were created out of a division of the large 
Diocese of South Florida. Bishop Henry I. Louttit, Bishop of South Florida presided over the primary Conventions of each new diocese for the purpose of electing their Diocesan Bishops. The two Suffragan Bishops of South Florida were elected to be Diocesan Bishops in the areas in which they had been living and serving. Bishop William H. Folwell was elected to become the second Bishop of Central Florida.

On January 29, 2000 at the 31st Convention of the Diocese, held in Orlando, the delegates approved a new vision for the diocese which called for the revitalization of existing congregations and the establishment of 15 new congregations between 2001 and 2010. At the 34th Convention of the diocese, in January 2003, the diocese kicked off From Strength to Strength - a campaign to fund the new vision approved in 2000. In 2004, at the 35th Convention, the diocese became a member of the Anglican Communion Network, a decision which was reversed when the diocese withdrew from the Network in 2008.

The diocese comprises five deaneries: Central, Northeast, Northwest, Southeast, and Southwest. As of 2006 there were 75 parishes and 11 missions in the diocese. The diocesan cathedral is the Cathedral Church of St. Luke in Orlando.

List of bishops

Diocesan organizations and facilities
Besides managing 7 retirement homes, 4 prep-schools, and 20 day schools the diocese has the following facilities: 
Camp Wingmann Church Camp
Canterbury Retreat & Conference Center
The Institute for Christian Studies

See also

 William Crane Gray, first Bishop of the Missionary Jurisdiction of Southern Florida, which in 1922 became the Diocese of South Florida.

References

Footnotes

Bibliography

External links

Central Florida
Episcopal Church in Florida
Christian organizations established in 1969
Province 4 of the Episcopal Church (United States)
1969 establishments in Florida